Salehiyeh (also Romanized as Şāleḩīyeh) is a village in Doruneh Rural District, Anabad District, Bardaskan County, Razavi Khorasan Province, Iran. At the 2006 census, its population was 167, in 38 families.

References 

Populated places in Bardaskan County